Priscilla Collins is a prominent Aboriginal leader, advocate and television producer. Collins is currently the Chief Executive Officer of the North Australian Aboriginal Justice Agency (NAAJA),  the largest law firm in the Northern Territory of Australia.

Early life
Collins is of Eastern Arrernte descent and grew up in Alice Springs in Central Australia, the eldest of five children.

Career

Collins is an outspoken advocate on issues affecting Aboriginal people across the Northern Territory, including the overrepresentation of Aboriginal people in prison, overcrowding and homelessness and problems in the Northern Territory Government’s mismanagement of remote public housing.

Collins is currently the Chief Executive Officer of the North Australian Aboriginal Justice Agency (NAAJA), an Aboriginal and Torres Strait Islander Legal Service, which is also the largest law firm in the Northern Territory.

Collins was awarded the Telstra Business Woman’s Award for Community and Government in 2011.

She is a non-member director of the Danila Dilba Health Service. She was previously the Chief Executive Officer of the Central Australian Aboriginal Media Association (CAAMA), Australia’s largest Aboriginal media organisation. Collins was heavily involved of the establishment of Australia’s first Indigenous television station, NITV. She has been on the Boards of Indigenous Business Australia, Imparja Television, National Indigenous Television Service and Indigenous Screen Australia, MusicNT and Chairperson of the Australian Indigenous Communications Association.

Collins has produced television documentaries for SBS and ABC. When her children commented that her documentaries were 'boring' she decided to make a children's television show. She was the Executive Producer and Creator of the first Indigenous children’s television series called Double Trouble produced for a commercial network, Channel Nine and Disney. Double Trouble was nominated for an Australian Film Institute award in 2008 for Best Children’s Drama.

Personal life

Collins has six children and lives in Darwin.

References

Living people
People from the Northern Territory
Australian indigenous rights activists
Women human rights activists
Australian women activists
Year of birth missing (living people)